András Csonka (born 1 May 2000) is a Hungarian footballer who plays as a midfielder for Budafoki MTE in Nemzeti Bajnokság II on loan from Ferencváros.

Career

Ferencváros
On 20 July 2017, Csonka made his professional debut against FC Midtjylland in 2017–18 UEFA Europa League Second qualifying round.

On 16 June 2020, he became champion with Ferencváros by beating Budapest Honvéd FC at the Hidegkuti Nándor Stadion on the 30th match day of the 2019–20 Nemzeti Bajnokság I season.

Club statistics

Updated to games played as of 15 May 2022.

References

2000 births
Living people
Footballers from Budapest
Hungarian footballers
Association football midfielders
Hungary youth international footballers
Hungary under-21 international footballers
Ferencvárosi TC footballers
Soroksár SC players
Budafoki LC footballers
Gyirmót FC Győr players
Nemzeti Bajnokság I players
Nemzeti Bajnokság II players
21st-century Hungarian people